Zagadrav (also Romanized as Zagadrāv) is a village in Akhtachi-ye Gharbi Rural District, in the Central District of Mahabad County, West Azerbaijan Province, Iran. At the 2006 census, its population was 40, in 9 families.

References 

Populated places in Mahabad County